Prioleau is a surname. People with that name include:

Betsy Prioleau, American non-fiction author.
Dijon Prioleau (born 1992), American gospel singer.
Edward Prioleau Warren (1856–1937), British architect and geologist.
Hamilton Prioleau Bee (1822-1897), American politician.
James Prioleau Richards (1894-1979), American politician.
Pierson Prioleau (born 1977), American football player.
Samuel Prioleau, American politician.

See also
John Cordes Prioleau House, a historic mansion in Charleston, South Carolina